Irakly Luarsabovich Andronikov (the last name spelled also Andronnikov or Andronikashvili, ;  – 11 June 1990) was a Soviet and Russian literature historian, philologist, spoken word artist and media personality.

Irakly Andronikov came from a Georgian noble family of Andronikashvili (Andronikov) and was born in Saint Petersburg. His father Luarsab Nikolaevich Andronikov was a lawyer whom the Russian Provisional Government appointed Senate Criminal Department Secretary in 1917. Irakly's mother Yekaterina Gurevich came from an artistic Gurevich-Ilyin family. Irakly's maternal grandfather Yakov Gurevich was the founder of Bestuzhev Courses, the first Russian tertiary school for women. Irakly's grandmother Lyubov Gurevich (née Ilyina) was a daughter of architect Ivan Ivanovich Ilyin (one of the builders of the Grand Kremlin Palace) and an aunt of philosopher Ivan Ilyin. His aunt Liubov Gurevich and uncle Yakov Yakovlevich Gurevich were notable writers and magazine editors. Irakly's younger brother Elepter Andronikashvili was a notable physicist.

In 1918 Luarsab was invited to teach philosophy at Tula State Pedagogical Institute in Tula, Russia. In 1921 the family briefly moved to Moscow and then settled in Tbilisi. In 1925 Irakly graduated from a secondary school in Tbilisi and entered the Faculty of History and Philology at Leningrad State University and the philological department of the Art History Institute. He studied history and philology under Boris Mikhailovich Eikhenbaum, Viktor Zhirmunsky, Lev Shcherba, Yevgeny Tarle. In 1928 he became interested in music and worked as a lecturer for the Leningrad Philharmonic.

In 1930 Andronikov graduated from Leningrad State University and started to work for children magazines Chizh and Yozh. From 1934 he worked as a bibliographer for the Leningrad Public Library. He started to study biography and the works of Russian poet Mikhail Lermontov at the university and continued his study while working in the library. He published his first article about Lermontov in 1936 and in 1939 he published his book Lermontov Life. The same year he was admitted to the Union of Soviet Writers.

In 1942 Andronikov worked as a correspondent of an Army newspaper on Kalinin Front.

In 1946 he obtained his Kandidat Nauk degree for a dissertation about Lermontov. He continued to publish books about Lermontov «Рассказы литературоведа» (1949), «Лермонтов» (1951), «Лермонтов. Исследования, статьи, рассказы» (1952), «Лермонтов в Грузии в 1837 году» (1955). The last book, Lermontov in Georgia in 1837, was considered sufficient to give him the Doktor Nauk degree of Moscow State University (1956). He continued his Lermontov study and in 1967 he received the USSR State Prize for his book «Лермонтов. Исследования и находки» (Lermontov. Research and Findings) published in 1964. Andronikov also was awarded Lenin Prize (1976) for his contributions to Russian culture.

Andronikov started to perform public lectures in a writers club in 1935 and soon became enormously popular. In 1954 he started to perform on television (show Andronikov Tells (Андроников Рассказывает). A number of documentaries there he tells his stories: «Загадка Н. Ф. И.», «Страницы большого искусства», «Портреты неизвестных», «Слово Андроникова» were published. In 1982 he was awarded People's Artist of the USSR title. He died in Moscow in 1990.

References

External links
The Portrait, (story), from Such a Simple Thing and Other Stories, FLPH, Moscow, 1959. 
Documentary Andronikov Tells 
Prose by Andronikov on lib.ru 
N.F.I. Mystery by Irakly Andronikov 

1908 births
1990 deaths

Soviet philologists
Communist Party of the Soviet Union members
Saint Petersburg State University alumni
People's Artists of the USSR
Lenin Prize winners
Irakly
Jewish Russian writers

Soviet Jews
Soviet literary historians
Soviet male writers
Soviet television presenters
Spoken word artists
Burials at Vvedenskoye Cemetery